Argyroupoli is a suburb in the southern part of the Athens agglomeration, Greece. Since the 2011 local government reform it is part of the Elliniko-Argyroupoli municipality, of which it is the seat and a municipal unit. A bustling suburb today, it's known for its cafès, restaurants and bars.

Name
The city's name derives from the Greek words άργυρος (árgyros meaning silver) and πόλη (poli meaning city).  The name's older form was Argyroupolis. The first name of the settlement was New Argyroupolis, given by the refugees from Gümüşhane, Turkey.

History
As a part of the population exchange between Greece and Turkey after the Greco-Turkish war of 1919-1922, a number of refugees fled to Attica from the former Ottoman Empire. In 1926, refugees from Argyroupolis in northeastern Turkey (modern Gümüşhane meaning "silver house") arrived in site, then named Ktima Geroulanou. They named the new settlement Nea Argyroupolis as a remembrance to their old hometown. There was presumably much resemblance between the two towns as, Argyroupoli is built on a plain with the Hymettus mountain to its north, as Gümüşhane is built on a plain with the Pontic Alps to the north. One of the first tasks of the settlers was to build the church of Αγία Βαρβάρα (St. Barbara), named after the patron saint of the now Turkish city.

During the Second World War, the settlement was used by the Germans to protect their ammunition and airplanes that were stationed in the nearby airfield. On December 6, 1943, the settlement was bombed by the British Royal Air Force. Although there were reportedly no casualties amongst the population, the settlement was razed to the ground.

The settlement was part of the community of Kalamaki until 1949, when it became a separate community. It was elevated to municipality status in 1972.

Geography

The municipality has an area of 8.228 km2. It borders Ilioupoli municipality to the North, Alimos municipality and Elliniko municipal district to the West and Glyfada municipality to the South. The city is traversed by the Vouliagmenis Avenue, which connects downtown Athens with the southern suburbs. The three major shopping districts are Kyprou Avenue, M. Geroulanou Avenue and part of Vouliagmenis Avenue. Numerous public bus lines run through Argyroupoli connecting the district with Athens center and Glyfada. The subway stations that serve the suburb are Argyroupoli metro station and Alimos metro station. 

Argyroupoli has a mild climate, affected by the sea and the mountain. It rarely snows, but rain is common. During summer, high temperatures are recorded.

Historical population

International relations

Twin towns – Sister cities
Argyroupoli is twinned with:
 Castanet-Tolosan, France
 Moncalieri, Italy

Notable people 

, singer
Katerina Georgiadou, fashion model
, actor
Kostas Tsakonas, actor

References

External links

Video on Argyroupoli's history (Greek)

Elliniko-Argyroupoli
Populated places in South Athens (regional unit)